The southwestern rock-skink, spectacled rock skink  or Jurien Bay rock-skink (Liopholis pulchra) is a species of skink, a lizard in the family Scincidae. The species is endemic to southwestern Australia.

References

Skinks of Australia
Liopholis
Reptiles described in 1910
Taxa named by Franz Werner